The Young Victoria is an Australian television film of 1963 which aired on ABC on 27 March 1963. Based on the play Victoria Regina, it is a 60-minute drama about the courtship and marriage of Queen Victoria to Prince Albert. It stars Lola Brooks as Victoria and Ric Hutton as Albert.

The production was reduced to four vignettes. It was sponsored by the International ' Theatre Institute, the drama-wing of-UNESCO, to celebrate World Theatre day. It was shown on the same day in Sydney, Melbourne and Adelaide to celebrate the day.

Premise
The courtship of Queen Victoria and Prince Albert.

Cast
Lola Brooks as Victoria
Ric Hutton as Albert
Anne Beecher		
Jasmine Greenfield as Lady Jane		
Benita Harvey		
Jessica Noad as a duchess
Alastair Roberts		
Frank Taylor		
Judith Thompson		
Vaughan Tracey		
Rhod Walker as Ernest, Albert's brother

Production
Douglas Smith did the sets.

Reception
The Sydney Morning Herald gave the film a mixed review, calling it "mildly entertaining and agreeably presented" but also "these excerpts did not succeed in amounting to a play... it was all rather like a musical comedy without the music".

The Age gave it a mixed review.

The Bulletin gave the production "three cheers".

See also
List of live television plays broadcast on Australian Broadcasting Corporation (1950s)

References

External links
The Young Victoria on IMDb

1963 television films
1960s Australian television plays
Australian television films
Australian Broadcasting Corporation original programming
English-language television shows
Black-and-white Australian television shows
Cultural depictions of Queen Victoria on television
1963 films
Films directed by Alan Burke (director)